Rhabdocline is a genus of fungi in the family Hemiphacidiaceae. The genus contains 3 species.

References

External links
Rhabdocline at Index Fungorum

Helotiales
Helotiales genera
Taxa named by Hans Sydow